Mecanhelas District is a district of Niassa Province in northern Mozambique. The principal town is Mecanhelas.

Further reading
District profile (PDF)

Districts in Niassa Province